The 1758 papal conclave (May 15 – July 6), convoked after the death of Pope Benedict XIV, elected Cardinal Carlo Rezzonico of Venice, who took the name Clement XIII.

The conclave

Divisions among cardinals
College of Cardinals was divided into several factions, which initially formed two blocs:

Curial group – it included two factions of curial Cardinals: Anziani – the small party of the Cardinals created by Pope Clement XII with his Cardinal-nephew Neri Maria Corsini as leader; and Zelanti – the group of the conservative Cardinals, headed by Cardinal Giuseppe Spinelli, who generally opposed any secular influence on the Church.
Union of Crowns – it included representatives and allies of the Catholic courts. The interests of Ferdinand VI of Spain were represented by Portocarrero, those of Charles V of Sicily/Charles VII of Naples – by Orsini, and those of Maria Theresa of Austria and her consort Francis I, Holy Roman Emperor by Alessandro Albani (also protector of Sardinia) and von Rodt. The French faction was leaderless at the time of death of Benedict XIV, because Cardinal-protector of France Pierre Guérin de Tencin died on March 2, 1758. King Louis XV of France appointed Cardinal Prospero Colonna di Sciarra as his successor, but this nomination became publicly known only on June 9, almost a month after the beginning of the conclave.

Many cardinals created by Benedict XIV (called "Juniors") did not belong to any faction, but majority of them aligned themselves with "Union of Crowns", particularly with Spanish protector Portocarrero.

During the conclave, however, these two groups mixed with each other. Near the end of the conclave, on the one side there was the Imperial faction together with Zelanti, and on the other side Anziani, together with the Bourbon faction (defending the interests of the Bourbon crowns).

Because of the absence of the political representatives of the main Catholic courts the ambassadors of France and the Empire asked the electors for delay voting until their arrival. This demand was rejected before the conclave began.

The beginning and the early candidates
Only twenty-seven cardinals entered the conclave on May 15. Eighteen more cardinals arrived in Rome by June 29. Meantime, however, Cardinal Bardi had to leave the conclave due to illness.

No serious candidates were proposed in the early ballots. In the first scrutiny on May 16 the greatest number of votes (eight in the ballot and three more in the accessus) were received Dean of the College of Cardinals Rainiero d'Elci, who was 88 years old. It does not mean, however, that no efforts to obtain the support for the candidates were made by the leaders present in the conclave. In particular Corsini worked vigorously for the election of Giuseppe Spinelli, leader of the Zelanti, but met with the strong opposition of Orsini, Cardinal Protector of the Kingdom of Naples. The protector of Spain, Portocarrero, also rejected Spinelli, and was able to join many of the "Juniors" to his party. Finally, the candidature of Spinelli had to be withdrawn.

The first candidate with serious chances for election was Alberico Archinto, Secretary of State and Vice-Chancellor of the deceased pope. He had a strong support both among Zelanti and some of the "Crown-Cardinals", but the faction of Corsini did not agree to support him and produced as counter-candidate Marcello Crescenzi. Eventually, as had occurred many times before and later, the candidatures of Archinto and Crescenzi eliminated each other.

The arrival of the French cardinals and their exclusion against Cavalchini
Gradually, the representatives of royal courts arrived in Rome with instructions from their monarchs. On June 4 entered Cardinal Luynes with the instructions of Louis XV of France. Five days later he officially announced the nomination of Cardinal Prospero Colonna di Sciarra to the post of Protector of France. But the Imperial Cardinal von Rodt was still awaited.

During the next days the new candidate Carlo Alberto Guidobono Cavalchini,   received still more votes, promoted by Corsini and Portocarrero working together. On June 19 he obtained twenty-one votes, on June 21 twenty-six, and in the evening of June 22 as many as twenty-eight out of forty-three, which meant that he was only one vote short of being elected. But after that ballot Cardinal Luynes informed the Dean of the Sacred College Rainiero d’Elci of the official veto of the King of France against Cavalchini. France opposed Cavalchini because of his support of the beatification of Robert Bellarmine and in the matters connected with the anti-Jansenist bull Unigenitus. The exclusion met with strong protests, but Cavalchini himself said, "It is a manifest proof that God deems me unworthy to fill the functions of his vicar upon earth".

After the collapse of Cavalchini's candidacy, Portocarrero advanced as a new candidate Paolucci, but he was rejected by French, who – together with the faction of Corsini, voted again for Crescenzi.

The arrival of Cardinal von Rodt
The arrival of Cardinal von Rodt on June 29 with the instructions of the Imperial Court was the turning point of the conclave. He initially tried to achieve an agreement with the French, but having failed, he turned toward the Zelanti faction. Direct negotiations between von Rodt and Spinelli resulted in the proposal for election of the Venetian Cardinal Carlo Rezzonico, bishop of Padua. On July 6 in the morning the bishop of Padua received eight votes in the ballot and four additional in the accessus. Portocarrero, Albani and the French cardinals initially opposed, but finally agreed for him. After the consultations of French Cardinals with ambassador Laon it became clear that Rezzonico would be elected to the Papacy.

The election of Pope Clement XIII
On July 6 in the evening Carlo Rezzonico was elected Pope, receiving thirty-one votes out of forty-four, one more than the required majority of two-thirds. The remaining thirteen (including his own) fell to Cardinal Dean Rainiero d'Elci. Rezzonico accepted his election and took the name of Clement XIII, in honour of Pope Clement XII, who had elevated him to the cardinalate in 1737. He was crowned on July 16 in the loggia of the patriarchal Vatican Basilica by protodeacon Alessandro Albani.

List of participants
Pope Benedict XIV died on May 3, 1758. Forty-five out of fifty-five Cardinals participated in the subsequent conclave. Only forty-four, however, voted in the final ballot, because Cardinal Bardi left the conclave because of illness on June 24:

Rainiero d'Elci (created Cardinal on December 20, 1737) – Cardinal-Bishop of Ostia e Velletri; commendatario of S. Sabina; Dean of the Sacred College of Cardinals; Prefect of the S.C. of Ceremonies
Giovanni Antonio Guadagni (September 24, 1731) – Cardinal-Bishop of Porto e Santa Rufina; Sub-Dean of the Sacred College of Cardinals; Vicar General of Rome
Francesco Scipione Maria Borghese (July 6, 1729) – Cardinal-Bishop of Albano; Cardinal-protector of Order of Franciscans
Giuseppe Spinelli (January 17, 1735) – Cardinal-Bishop of Palestrina; Prefect of the S.C. for the Propagation of Faith
 Carlo Maria Sacripante (September 30, 1739) – Cardinal-Bishop of Frascati
Joaquín Fernández Portocarrero Mendoza (September 9, 1743) – Cardinal-Bishop of Sabina; Prefect of the S.C. of Indulgences and Sacred Relics; Cardinal-protector of the Kingdom of Spain
Carlo Rezzonico (December 20, 1737) – Cardinal-Priest of S. Marco; Bishop of Padua
Domenico Passionei (June 23, 1738) – Cardinal-Priest of S. Prassede; commendatario of S. Bartolomeo all’Isola; Secretary of Apostolic Briefs; Librarian of the Holy Roman Church
 Camillo Paolucci (September 9, 1743) – Cardinal-Priest of S. Maria in Trastevere; commendatario of SS. Giovanni e Paolo; Cardinal-protector of the Order Carmelites
Carlo Alberto Guidobono Cavalchini (September 9, 1743) – Cardinal-Priest of S. Maria della Pace; Prefect of the S.C. of Bishops and Regulars
Giacomo Oddi (September 9, 1743) – Cardinal-Priest of S. Anastasia; Archbishop of Viterbo e Toscanella
 Federico Marcello Lante (September 9, 1743) – Cardinal-Priest of S. Silvestro in Capite; Governor of Balneario
 Marcello Crescenzi (September 9, 1743) – Cardinal-Priest of S. Maria in Transpontina; Archbishop of Ferrara
 Giorgio Doria (September 9, 1743) – Cardinal-Priest of S. Cecilia; commendatario of S. Agostino; Prefect of the S.C. of Good Government
Giuseppe Pozzobonelli (September 9, 1743) – Cardinal-Priest of S. Maria in Via; Archbishop of Milan
 Girolamo de’ Bardi (September 9, 1743) – Cardinal-Priest of S. Maria degli Angeli alla Terme 
 Fortunato Tamburini (September 9, 1743) – Cardinal-Priest of S. Callisto; Prefect of the S.C. of Rites
 Daniele Delfino (April 10, 1747) – Cardinal-Priest of S. Maria sopra Minerva; archbishop of Udine
Carlo Vittorio Amedeo delle Lanze (April 10, 1747) – Cardinal-Priest of S. Sisto; Titular Archbishop of Nicosia
Henry Benedict Stuart (July 3, 1747) – Cardinal-Priest of SS. XII Apostoli; commendatario of S. Maria in Portico; Archpriest of the patriarchal Vatican Basilica; Camerlengo of the Sacred College of Cardinals
Giuseppe Maria Feroni (November 26, 1753) – Cardinal-Priest of S. Pancrazio
Fabrizio Serbelloni (November 26, 1753) – Cardinal-Priest of S. Stefano al Monte Celio; Legate in Bologna
Giovanni Francesco Stoppani (November 26, 1753) – Cardinal-Priest of S. Martino ai Monti; Legate in Romagna
Luca Melchiorre Tempi (November 26, 1753) – Cardinal-Priest of S. Croce in Gerusalemme
Carlo Francesco Durini (November 26, 1753) – Cardinal-Priest of SS. IV Coronati; Archbishop of Pavia
Cosimo Imperiali (November 26, 1753) – Cardinal-Priest of S. Clemente
Vincenzo Malvezzi (November 26, 1753) – Cardinal-Priest of SS. Marcellino e Pietro; Archbishop of Bologna
Clemente Argenvilliers (November 26, 1753) – Cardinal-Priest of SS. Trinita al Monte Pincio; Prefect of the S.C. of the Tridentine Council
Antonio Andrea Galli (November 26, 1753) – Cardinal-Priest of S. Pietro in Vincoli; Grand penitentiary; Prefect of the S.C. of Index
Antonio Sersale (April 22, 1754) – Cardinal-Priest of S. Pudenziana; Archbishop of Naples
Alberico Archinto (April 5, 1756) – Cardinal-Priest of S. Lorenzo in Damaso; Cardinal Secretary of State; Vice-Chancellor of the Holy Roman Church
Giovanni Battista Rotario (April 5, 1756) – Cardinal-Priest of S. Crisogono; Archbishop of Turin
Paul d'Albert de Luynes (April 5, 1756) – Cardinal-Priest of S. Tommaso in Parione; Archbishop of Sens
Etienne-René Potier de Gesvres (April 5, 1756) – Cardinal-Priest of S. Agnese fuori le mura; Bishop of Beauvais
Franz Konrad Casimir von Rodt (April 5, 1756) – Cardinal-Priest of S. Maria del Popolo; Bishop of Constance
Alessandro Albani (July 16, 1721) – Cardinal-Deacon of S. Maria in Via Lata; commendatario of S. Maria in Cosmedin; Protodeacon of the Sacred College of Cardinals; Cardinal-protector of the Habsburg monarchy and of the Kingdom of Sardinia
Neri Maria Corsini (August 14, 1730) – Cardinal-Deacon of S. Eustachio; Archpriest of the patriarchal Lateran Basilica; Secretary of the Supreme S.C. Congregation of the Roman and Universal Inquisition; Prefect of the Tribunal of the Apostolic Signature of Justice; Cardinal-protector of the Kingdom of Portugal
Agapito Mosca (October 1, 1732) – Cardinal-Deacon of S. Agata in Suburra
Girolamo Colonna di Sciarra (September 9, 1743) – Cardinal-Deacon of SS. Cosma e Damiano; Camerlengo of the Holy Roman Church; Archpriest of the patriarchal Liberian Basilica
Prospero Colonna di Sciarra (September 9, 1743) – Cardinal-Deacon of S. Maria ad Martyres; Prefect of the Tribunal of the Apostolic Signature of Grace; Cardinal-protector of the Kingdom of France
Domenico Orsini d'Aragona (September 9, 1743) – Cardinal-Deacon of S. Nicola in Carcere Tulliano; Cardinal-protector of the Kingdom of Naples
Gian Francesco Albani (April 10, 1747) – Cardinal-Deacon of S. Cesareo in Palatio; Cardinal-protector of the Kingdom of Poland
Flavio II Chigi (November 26, 1753) – Cardinal-Deacon of S. Angelo in Pescheria
Giovanni Francesco Banchieri (November 26, 1753) – Cardinal-Deacon of S. Adriano; Legate in Ferrara
Luigi Maria Torregiani (November 26, 1753) – Cardinal-Deacon of SS. Vito e Modesto

Thirty five electors were created by Benedict XIV, eight by Clement XII, one by Benedict XIII (Borghese) and Innocent XIII (A. Albani).

Absentees
Ten cardinals were entirely absent from this conclave:

Cardinal d'Alsace (November 29, 1719) – Cardinal-Priest of S. Lorenzo in Lucina; Protopriest of the Sacred College of Cardinals; Archbishop of Mechelen
Joseph Dominicus von Lamberg (December 20, 1737) – Cardinal-Priest of S. Pietro in Montorio; Bishop of Passau
John Theodore of Bavaria (September 9, 1743) – Cardinal-Priest of S. Lorenzo in Panisperna; Bishop of Liège; Administrator of Freising and Ratisbon
Álvaro Eugenio de Mendoza Caamaño y Sotomayor (April 10, 1747) – Cardinal-Priest [no titulus assigned]; Patriarch of the West Indies; Titular Archbishop of Farsalos
Giovanni Battista Mesmer (April 10, 1747) – Cardinal-Priest of S. Onofrio
José Manuel d'Atalaia (April 10, 1747) – Cardinal-Priest [no titulus assigned]; Patriarch of Lisbon
Luis Fernández de Córdoba (December 18, 1754) – Cardinal-Priest [no titulus assigned]; Archbishop of Toledo 
Nicholas de Saulx-Tavannes (April 5, 1756) – Cardinal-Priest [no titulus assigned]; Archbishop of Rouen
Francisco de Solís Folch de Cardona (April 5, 1756) – Cardinal-Priest [no titulus assigned]; Archbishop of Seville
Francisco de Saldanha da Gama (April 5, 1756) – Cardinal-Deacon [no deaconry assigned]

All the absentees were creatures of Benedict XIV, except d'Alsace, who was created by Clement XI, and Lamberg, who was appointed by Clement XII.

Notes

Sources
 List of participants of conclave, 1758 by S. Miranda
 Papal Library: biography of Pope Clement XIII
 

1758 in the Papal States
1758
1758 in politics
18th-century Catholicism
1758 in Europe
1758 in Christianity
18th-century elections in Europe